Mozambique has abundant energy sources available for exploitation. As of 2021, the country was ranked first in energy potential of all the countries in the Southern African Power Pool (SAPP), with an estimated energy capacity of 187,000 MW. Available energy sources include coal, hydroelectricity, natural gas, solar energy and wind power. As of September 2021, the largest proportion of the power currently generated is from hydroelectric sources. However the energy mix in the country is changing. Natural gas powered energy stations are expected to provide 44 percent of total energy generation from 2020 to 2030.

Background
In 2018, with an "average operating generation capacity of 2,279 MW", the country had an electricity consumption of 415 kWh per person, per year, about 50 kWh higher than the then prevailing average for Sub-Saharan Africa. It is estimated that 85 percent of electricity consumption in Mozambique is consumed by industry.

As of March 2021, the electrification rate for Mozambique's estimated 32 million citizens was 34 percent. Contributing factors include an underdeveloped transmission and distribution network, lack of funding and bureaucracy constraints. Network expansion is driven by industry and business growth. The average Mozambican domestic consumer cannot afford the electricity tariffs, although they are heavily subsidized by the government of Mozambique.

Mozambique is a net exporter of electricity to the members of SAPP, primarily South Africa. Electricidade de Moçambique (EDM) is the national electric monopoly company. 65 percent of its national electric sales revenue is derived from the capital city of Maputo and the surrounding Maputo Province.

Hydroelectricity
As of 2019, Mozambique had 2,185 MW of installed hydroelectric generation capacity, accounting for 92 percent of total national installed capacity of 2,375 MW.

The 2,075 megawatts Cahora Bassa Hydroelectric Power Station (CBHPS) across the Zambezi River, is the largest power station in Mozambique. The power station is operated by Hidroelectrica de Cahora Bassa (HCB), a Mozambican parastatal company. HCB sells 65 percent of its output (about 1,349 megawatts), directly to South Africa via the  Cahora Bassa–Johannesburg High Voltage Transmission Line. Some of the remaining 35 percent (about 726 megawatts), is exported to Zimbabwe and the rest is distributed to the northern provinces of Mozambique.

There are over 3,400 megawatts of hydropower stations in the pipeline in Mozambique, the majority planned across the Zambezi River, including the 1,500 megawatts Mphanda Nkuwa Hydroelectric Power Station and the proposed 1,245 megawatts extension to the CBHPS. The country has over 3,000 megawatts of potential small hydropower sites across all regions.

Solar energy
Mozambique has a potential solar energy yield estimated between 1,785 and 2,206 kWh/m2/year, resulting in a solar energy potential of 23,000GWh/year. In August 2019, the first grid-ready solar power station, the 40 megawatts Mocuba Solar Power Station, in Mocuba District, Zambezia Province, achieved commercial commissioning. Developed as a public–private partnership (PPP) project, it is co-owned by a European IPP, a Mozambican parastatal and a European financier.

Other solar power installations, which are in different stages of development include the 20 megawatts Cuamba Solar Power Station in Niassa Province, the 40 megawatts Dondo Solar Power Station, in Sofala Province, the 41 megawatts Metoro Solar Power Station in Cabo Delgado Province and the 100 megawatts Nacala Solar Power Station in Nampula Province.

Wind power
In September 2020, EleQtra, an American IPP, began construction of the 120 megawatts Namaacha Wind Power Station, in Maputo Province, the first grid-ready wind farm in Mozambique. Completion is anticipated in 2023.

Oil and natural gas

Mozambique has proven natural gas reserves in excess of 180 trillion cubic feet. In the north of the country, AREA1 is under concession to TotalEnergies. AREA4 is concessioned to ENI and ExxonMobil. In Inhambane Province, Sasol Limited processes natural gas for export via pipeline to South Africa with a fraction sent to Maputo for domestic consumption. The reserves in this province are estimated at 2.6 trillion cubic feet.

See also
 List of power stations in Mozambique
 Southern African Power Pool

References

External links
 Mozambique Energy Situation As of 2020.

 
Environment of Mozambique
Politics of Mozambique